The Lower East Side History Project (LESHP) is a non-profit organization dedicated to researching, documenting and preserving the history of the greater Lower East Side of New York City.

History
Founded in 2003 by Eric Ferrara, LESHP provides educational programming to K-12 and university level students, public & private walking tours, media consultation, research services, special events, lectures, and presentations.

Research concentrates on the several distinct neighborhoods that make up the traditional Lower East Side, including: East Village, Alphabet City, the Bowery, Chinatown, Two Bridges, Nolita and Little Italy.

In June 2009 LESHP received a prestigious award and grant from the Citizen's Committee for New York City, an organization founded in the 1970s by Jacob Javitz. In June 2012, LESHP was honored with a Greenwich Village Society for Historic Preservation award.

References

External links
 
 LESHP blog

Organizations based in New York City
History of New York City
Lower East Side